This is an alphabetical list of notable Marathi television actors.

A

B

C

D

G

H

J

K

L

M

N

P

R

S

T

U

V

Y

References 

Male actors in Marathi television
Actresses in Marathi television
television